Lists of airports in Asia cover airports in each country of Asia, organized by activity and by region and country. They include military air bases and civilian airports. There are lists for countries with limited international recognition and for dependencies of other countries.

By activity

 List of the busiest airports in Asia
 List of the busiest airports in Southeast Asia

Western Asia

List of airports in Abkhazia
List of airports in Armenia
List of airports in the Republic of Artsakh
List of airports in Azerbaijan
List of airports in Bahrain
List of airports in Cyprus
List of airports in Northern Cyprus
List of airports in Georgia
List of airports in Iraq
List of airports in Israel
List of airports in Jordan
List of airports in Kuwait
List of airports in Lebanon
List of airports in Oman
List of airports in the State of Palestine
List of airports in Qatar
List of airports in Russia
List of airports in Saudi Arabia
List of airports in Syria
List of airports in Turkey
List of airports in the United Arab Emirates
List of airports in Yemen

Central Asia

List of airports in Kazakhstan
List of airports in Kyrgyzstan
List of airports in Tajikistan
List of airports in Turkmenistan
List of airports in Uzbekistan

Southern Asia

List of airports in Afghanistan
List of airports in Bangladesh
List of airports in Bhutan
List of airports in the British Indian Ocean Territory
List of airports in India
List of airports in Iran
List of airports in the Maldives
List of airports in Nepal
List of airports in Pakistan
List of airports in Sri Lanka

Eastern Asia

List of airports in China
List of airports in Hong Kong
List of airports in Japan
List of airports in Macau
List of airports in Mongolia
List of airports in North Korea
List of airports in South Korea
List of airports in Taiwan

Southeastern Asia

List of airports in Brunei
List of airports in Cambodia
List of airports in East Timor
List of airports in Indonesia
List of airports in Laos
List of airports in Malaysia
List of airports in Myanmar
List of airports in the Philippines
List of airports in Singapore
List of airports in Thailand
List of airports in Vietnam

See also
 Wikipedia:WikiProject Aviation/Airline destination lists: Asia

Asia
 
Asia-related lists